Christopher Doyle (born 17 February 1995) is an English footballer who plays as a defender for Southport.

Career
Doyle spent time in the Everton Academy from the age of 10 to 14 before joining Dickie Danson's youth setup at Morecambe.

Morecambe
He was awarded a professional contract a year early at the age of 17 at the start of the 2012–13 season. He made his first team debut in the club's 3–0 win against Rochdale coming on as a late substitute. Whilst at the club he joined Chorley on loan until the end of the 2014–15 season scoring five times in 26 appearances and reaching the Conference North play-off final. He signed an extended 12-month contract with the club at start of 2015–16 season. He was released by Morecambe in May 2016.

Southport
He joined Southport in August 2016.

Marine
Doyle joined Marine in July 2018.

FC United of Manchester
In August 2019 he joined FC United of Manchester.

Return to Southport
On 25 June 2021,  Southport Football Club announced Doyle was returning to the club on initial one year contract, with an option for a further year.

Education
Doyle attended Sacred Heart Catholic College situated in Crosby, Liverpool.

References

External links

English footballers
English Football League players
National League (English football) players
Morecambe F.C. players
Chorley F.C. players
Living people
1995 births
Southport F.C. players
Association football defenders
F.C. United of Manchester players